William Redish Pywell (June 9, 1843 – 1887) was a 19th-century American photographer. He first worked for Mathew Brady and Alexander Gardner making a photographic record of the American Civil War, this work was published by Gardner in 1866 as "Photographic Sketch Book of the War" Vols. 1 & 2. (Washington, DC. Philp & Solomons). After the war, he traveled with George Custer as the official photographer of the 1873 Yellowstone Expedition. He also accompanied Alexander Gardner on the Kansas Expedition.

References 
    

1843 births
1887 deaths
People of the American Old West
19th-century American photographers